Rubina Badar (14 February 1956 – 28 March 2006) was a Pakistani radio, TV, and film singer. She is known for her TV song, "Tum Sung Nainan Laagay".

Early life
Robina was born in 1956. She started her singing career from Radio Pakistan, Karachi. Then she came to Lahore to work as a playback singer in Lollywood.

Career
She rendered her voice in films such as Rangeela aur Munawar Zarif, Parda Na Uthao, Imandar, Intezar, Sharafat, Khatarnak, Bahishat, Izzat, Arzoo, Khanzada, and others. She sang 48 songs in 42 Urdu and Punjabi films.

In 1973, Rubina got a breakthrough as a singer when she vocalized a song for PTV, Karachi, "Tum Sung Nainan Laagay". Penned by Asad Muhammad Khan and composed by Khalid Nizami, the song turned out to be a milestone in her music career. Her other movie songs like, "Yonhi Din Kat Jaye" (along with A. Nayyar for film Bahaisht (1974)), "Rus Ke Tur Payeon Sarkaar" (for film: Khanzada (1975)), and "Jhoom Jhoom Nachay aayo" (along with Nahid Akhtar for film Anari (1975)), also became popular.

Illnes and death
Rubina died at age 50 from cancer on March 28, 2006 in Karachi.

Popular songs

Film
 Dada Jee, Apnay Potay Ko Samjhaen ... (1974 film: Parda Na Uthao - Urdu), Singer(s): Ahmad Rushdi, Robina Badar, Music: M. Ashraf
 Pak Watan Ki Dharti Pyari, Ham Ko Apni Jan Say Pyari ... (1974 film: Aaina Aur Soorat - Urdu), Singer(s): Ahmad Rushdi, Robina Badar, Music: M. Ashraf, Poet: Taslim Fazli
 Yuhni Din Cut Jayen, Yuhni Sham Dhal Jaye..1974 (1974 film: Bahisht - Urdu), Singer(s): Robina Badar, A. Nayyar, Music: A. Hameed, Poet: Taslim Fazli
 Piyar Ki Ek Nai Raah Pe 	1974 (1974 film: Intezar - Urdu), Singer(s): Robina Badar, Music: Nisar Bazmi, Poet: Masroor Anwar
 Twinkle, Twinkle, Little Star, How I Wonder What You Are ... (1975 film: Ajj Di Gall - Punjabi), Singer(s): Masood Rana, Robina Badar, Music: Tasadduq Hussain, Poet: Asad Bukhari
 Jhoom Jhoom Nachay Aayo ... (1975 film: Anari - Urdu), Singer(s): Naheed Akhtar, Robina Badar, Music: M. Ashraf, Poet: Taslim Fazli
 Sathi Na Chhorun Daaman Tera, Yeh Hahy Mera Faisala ...	 (1975 film: Izzat - Urdu), Singer(s): Robina Badar, Ahmad Rushdi, Music: A. Hameed, Poet: Taslim Fazli
 Rus Kay Tur Peye O Sarkar, Tor Kay Mera Sajra Pyar ...	 (1975 film: Khanzada - Punjabi), Singer(s): Robina Badar, Music: Nazir Ali
 Jitnay Pyaray Ho Tum, Khoobsurat Ho Tum, Itna Pyara Dil Ho To.	1975 (Film: Shikwa - Urdu), Singer(s): Robina Badar, Music: Nashad, Poet: Taslim Fazli

TV
 Tum Sung Nainan Laagay ... Poet: Asad Muhammad Khan, Music: Khalid Nizami
 Aaj Bhi Intezaar Hai

References

External links
 

1956 births
Urdu playback singers
20th-century Pakistani women singers
Pakistani radio personalities
21st-century Pakistani women singers
Pakistani ghazal singers
Radio personalities from Lahore
Urdu-language singers
2006 deaths
Pakistani playback singers
Punjabi-language singers
Pakistani classical singers
Pakistani women singers
Sindhi-language singers